Ivana Marková FBA (born 1938) is a British social psychologist known for her work on language and the constructs of communication.

She was born in Czechoslovakia and studied philosophy and psychology at Charles University in Prague. In 1967 she moved to the United Kingdom.  She initially worked as Research Fellow at Industrial Training Research Unit, University of London (1968–70) before moving to the University of Stirling, from which she retired in 2003 as an emeritus professor. She is the mother of Professor Ivana S. Marková, a distinguished psychiatrist in her own right.

Her main theoretical research interests are the ontology and epistemology of theory in social psychology, and the interdependence between social thinking, dialogue and semiotics. Empirical research concerns social representations of democracy, individualism and responsibility in post communist Europe and the study of dialogues between people with impaired speech and their partners.

She has served at various national and international committees, e.g. she was a member of the Chief Scientist's Health Services Research Committee, Scottish Home and Health Department, a chairperson of the Social Psychology Section of the British Psychological Society, President of Section J (Psychology) of the British Association for the Advancement of Science, a member of the Scientific Committee of the Academia Istropolitana, a newly established Centre of Advanced Studies in Central Europe, Bratislava, Slovakia.

Awards
 1999 - Fellow of the British Academy
 1997 - Fellow of the Royal Society of Edinburgh
 Fellow of the British Psychological Society

Books
 Markova, I. (Ed.) (1978).  Social context of language.  Chichester: Wiley
 Markova, I. (1982).  Paradigms, thought and language.  London: Wiley
 Markova, I., & Foppa, K. (Eds.) (1990). Dynamics of dialogue.  Prentice-Hall.
 Markova, I., & Foppa, K. (Eds.) (1991). Asymmetries in dialogue.  Prentice-Hall
 Markova, I., Graumann, C.F., & Foppa, K. (Eds.) (1995). Mutualities in dialogue.  Cambridge: Cambridge University Press.
 Markova, I., & Farr, R. (Eds.) (1995).  Representations of health, illness and handicap.  Amsterdam: Harwood Academic.
 Marková, I. (2003). Dialogicality and Social Representations. Cambridge: Cambridge University Press
 Markova, I. (ed.) (2004).  Trust and democratic transition in post-communist Europe.  Oxford: Oxford University press.
 Markova, Ivana & Moscovici, Serge. (2006). Making of Modern Social Psychology: The Hidden Story of How an International Social Science Was Created. Cambridge and Oxford: Polity Press.
 Markova, I. Linell, P., & Grossen, M. (2007).  Dialogue in focus groups: exploring socially shared knowledge.  London: Equinox.
 Marková, I. & Gillespie, A. (Eds.) (2007). Trust and distrust: Socio-cultural perspectives. Greenwich, CT: Information Age Publishing, Inc.
Markova, I. (2016). The Dialogical Mind: Common Sense and Ethics.  Cambridge: Cambridge University Press.

References

1938 births
Living people
British psychologists
Fellows of the British Academy
Charles University alumni
Academics of the University of Stirling
Fellows of the Royal Society of Edinburgh
Czechoslovak emigrants to the United Kingdom